William Stansfield, Stansfeld or Stanfield may refer to:

 William Stansfield (railway officer) (1874–1946), English/Australian railway officer and soldier
 William Crompton-Stansfield (1790–1871), English Whig politician and MP for Huddersfield (1837–53)
 Clarkson Frederick Stanfield (1793–1867), English marine painter (often inaccurately credited as "William Clarkson Stanfield")
 Fred Stanfield (Frederic William Stanfield, born 1944), Canadian ice hockey player

See also
 Stansfield (surname)
 Stansfield (disambiguation)
 Stansfeld
 Stanfield (surname)
 Standfield